Oluf Ring  (24 December 1884 – 26 April 1946) was a Danish composer.

See also
List of Danish composers

References
This article was initially translated from the Danish Wikipedia.

Danish composers
Male composers
1884 births
1946 deaths
20th-century male musicians